Mankurt is a 1990 Soviet film written by Mariya Urmadova and directed by Hojaguly Narliyev.

Background
The film was partially filmed on location in Syria and in Turkey, representing a Turkish-Soviet cooperation in filmmaking. The film is based on a narrative strand within the novel The Day Lasts More Than a Hundred Years ("И дольше века длится день") by Chinghiz Aitmatov, a philosophical tale about what can happen to people if they forget their motherland, language, and history. The Turkic legend mentioned in the novel conceives of a cruel way of making mankurts of captives in the hopes that they will forget everything but basic activities, rendering them servile minions to Zunghar conquerors.

Synopsis
The film is about a Turkmenian who defends his homeland from invasion. He is captured, tortured, and brainwashed into serving his homeland's conquerors. He is so completely turned that he kills his mother when she attempts to rescue him from captivity.

Cast
 Maya-Gozel Aymedova
 Nurberdi Allaberdiyev
 Maysa Almazova
 Baba Annanov
 Kerim Annanov
 
 Altyn Hojayeva
 Hommat Myllyk
 Hojadurdy Narliyev
 Tahyr Narliyev
 Mergen Niyazov
 Maya Nuryagdiyeva
 Sapar Odayev

See also
 Mankurt
 Pitchcapping

References

External links
 Mankurt at the Internet Movie Database

1990 films
Soviet-era Turkmenistan films
Films directed by Khodzha Kuli Narliyev
Turkish multilingual films
Soviet multilingual films
1990s Turkish-language films
1990 multilingual films